Savo Ekmečić (born 9 May 1948) is a retired Bosnian football goalkeeper.

Playing career
He played a large part of his career for Grazer AK, where he was voted the club's Player of the Century in 2002.

References

1948 births
Living people
Sportspeople from Mostar
Bosnia and Herzegovina emigrants to Austria
Association football goalkeepers
Bosnia and Herzegovina footballers
FK Sarajevo players
Grazer AK players
Austrian Football Bundesliga players
Yugoslav expatriate footballers
Expatriate footballers in Austria
Yugoslav expatriate sportspeople in Austria
Austrian football managers
Grazer AK managers
DSV Leoben managers
Yugoslav expatriate football managers
Bosnia and Herzegovina expatriate football managers
Expatriate football managers in Austria
Bosnia and Herzegovina expatriate sportspeople in Austria